Hespagarista caudata is a species of moth of the family Noctuidae. It is found in western Africa.

Agaristinae
Lepidoptera of the Democratic Republic of the Congo
Lepidoptera of the Republic of the Congo
Lepidoptera of West Africa
Lepidoptera of Malawi
Lepidoptera of Tanzania
Lepidoptera of Zambia
Moths of Sub-Saharan Africa
Moths described in 1879